Amauri d'Acigné (died 1477) was a Roman Catholic prelate who served as Bishop of Nantes (1462–1477).

Biography 
On 29 March 1462, Amauri d'Acigné was appointed during the papacy of Pope Pius II as Bishop of Nantes.
On 11 April 1462, he was consecrated bishop by Guillaume d'Estouteville, Cardinal-Bishop of Ostia e Velletri, with Jean de Beauvau, Bishop of Angers, and Isnard de Grasse, Bishop of Grasse, serving as co-consecrators.  He served as Bishop of Nantes until his death on 23 February 1477.

References 

15th-century French Roman Catholic bishops
Bishops appointed by Pope Pius II
1477 deaths